The 23rd Annual Screen Actors Guild Awards, honoring the best achievements in film and television performances for the year 2016, were presented on January 29, 2017 at the Shrine Auditorium in Los Angeles, California. The ceremony was broadcast on both TNT and TBS 8:00 p.m. EST / 5:00 p.m. PST. The nominees were announced on December 14, 2016.

Lily Tomlin was announced as the 2016 SAG Life Achievement Award honoree on August 4, 2016.

Winners and nominees
Note: Winners are listed first and highlighted in boldface.

Film

Television

Screen Actors Guild Life Achievement Award
 Lily Tomlin

In Memoriam
The segment honors the following who died in 2016:

 Ken Howard
 William Schallert
 Patty Duke
 Jack Riley
 Nancy Reagan
 Bill Nunn
 Alan Young
 Anton Yelchin
 Alexis Arquette
 Anne Jackson
 Kenny Baker
 Hugh O'Brian
 Florence Henderson
 Robert Vaughn
 William Christopher
 George Kennedy
 David Huddleston
 Doris Roberts
 Larry Drake
 Jon Polito
 Theresa Saldana
 Garry Shandling
 John McMartin
 Thomas Mikal Ford
 Robert Horton
 Beth Howland
 Ron Glass
 Fyvush Finkel
 Steven Hill
 Richard Libertini
 Abe Vigoda
 Dan Haggerty
 Prince
 Alan Thicke
 Zsa Zsa Gabor
 Garry Marshall
 Gene Wilder
 Mary Tyler Moore
 Carrie Fisher
 Debbie Reynolds

Presenters
Source:

 Dolly Parton (Lifetime Achievement Award)*
 Casey Affleck
 Mahershala Ali
 Naomie Harris
 Lucas Hedges
 Taraji P. Henson
 Brie Larson
 Janelle Monáe
 Viggo Mortensen
 Octavia Spencer
 Riz Ahmed
 Viola Davis
 Michelle Dockery
 Kathryn Hahn
 Salma Hayek
 Jonah Hill
 Kate Hudson
 Nicole Kidman
 Ashton Kutcher
 John Legend
 James Marsden
 Gina Rodriguez
 Denzel Washington
 Millie Bobby Brown
 Sophia Bush
 Gabrielle Carteris
 Common
 Gaten Matarazzo
 Caleb McLaughlin
 Alia Shawkat
 Finn Wolfhard
 Steven Yeun

*Jane Fonda was scheduled but did not appear due to illness.

References

External links
 

2016
2016 film awards
2016 television awards
2017 in Los Angeles
2016 in American cinema
2016 in American television
January 2017 events in the United States